Apollo Sweet (born 28 February 1957) is a Samoan/Australian professional boxer of the 1980s and '90s who won the Oriental and Pacific Boxing Federation (OPBF) cruiserweight title, Australian cruiserweight title, Australasian cruiserweight title, and Commonwealth cruiserweight title. He drew with John Bogolin for the South Pacific cruiserweight title, and was a challenger for the New South Wales State cruiserweight title against Jeff Harding.

Professional Boxing Titles
Australian national cruiserweight title (188½ Ibs)
WBC - OPBF cruiserweight title (188½ Ibs)
Australasian Cruiserweight Title (181½ Ibs)
Commonwealth (British Empire) cruiserweight title (181½ Ibs)

References

External links

1957 births
Cruiserweight boxers
Heavyweight boxers
Light-heavyweight boxers
Living people
Samoan male boxers
Super-middleweight boxers
Australian male boxers